Dame Lynley Stuart Dodd  (born 5 July 1941) is a New Zealand children's book author and illustrator. She is best known for her Hairy Maclary and Friends series, and its follow-ups, all of which feature animals with rhyming names and have sold over five million copies worldwide. In 1999, Dodd received the Margaret Mahy Award.

She was appointed a Distinguished Companion of the New Zealand Order of Merit in the 2002 New Year Honours, redesignated as a Dame Companion of the New Zealand Order of Merit in 2009.

Life and career

Dodd was born in Rotorua in 1941. She was an only child and lived with her parents in Kaingaroa Forest, near Taupo. She was educated at Iwitahi School and Tauranga College. Dodd graduated from the Elam School of Art in Auckland with a diploma in Fine Arts, and became an art teacher spending five years teaching at Queen Margaret College in Wellington. While there she met her husband Tony; he died in 2014 after an illness. After their marriage she began to work as a freelance illustrator. Her first book was My Cat Likes To Hide In Boxes, published in 1974, which she wrote along with Eve Sutton. Her first book written solo was The Nickle Nackle Tree (1976).

In 1983 the first book in her Hairy Maclary series, Hairy Maclary from Donaldson's Dairy, was published. It was followed by Hairy Maclary’s Bone (1984), Hairy Maclary Scattercat (1985), Hairy Maclary's Caterwaul Caper (1987), Hairy Maclary's Rumpus at the Vet (1989) and Hairy Maclary's Showbusiness (1991). The first, third, fourth and sixth of these all won the New Zealand Children's Picture Book of the Year Award; the second and fifth were shortlisted but did not win. In 1997, Dodd was the screenwriter for a TV series based on the Hairy Maclary series featuring 10 five-minute episodes narrated by Miranda Harcourt. In 2005 her book The Other Ark won the Children’s Choice Award at the New Zealand Post Book Awards. In 2015 a waterfront sculpture of Hairy Maclary and other characters from the books was officially unveiled in Tauranga by former New Zealand prime minister John Key. In an episode of the TVNZ series Goodnight Kiwi, airing on 25 December 2019, the prime minister Jacinda Ardern read Hairy Maclary from Donaldson's Dairy.  Dodd lived in Tauranga.

Honours and awards
In 1990, Dodd was awarded the New Zealand 1990 Commemoration Medal. In 1999, she became the ninth recipient of the Margaret Mahy Award. She was appointed a Distinguished Companion of the New Zealand Order of Merit in the 2002 New Year Honours, for services to children's literature and book illustration. Following the re-introduction of titular honours by the New Zealand government, she accepted redesignation as a Dame Companion of the New Zealand Order of Merit in 2009.

Books
1973 – My Cat Likes to Hide in Boxes
1976 – The Nickle Nackle Tree
1978 – Titimus Trim
1982 – The Apple Tree
1982 – The Smallest Turtle
1983 – Hairy Maclary from Donaldson's Dairy
1984 – Hairy Maclary's Bone
1985 – Hairy Maclary Scattercat
1986 – Wake Up, Bear
1987 – Hairy Maclary's Caterwaul Caper
1988 – A Dragon In A Wagon
1989 – Hairy Maclary's Rumpus at the Vet
1990 – Slinky Malinki
1991 – Find Me A Tiger
1991 – Hairy Maclary's Showbusiness
1992 – The Minister's Cat ABC
1993 – Slinky Malinki Open The Door
1994 – Schnitzel von Krumm’s Basketwork
1995 – Sniff-Snuff-Snap
1996 – Schnitzel von Krumm Forget-Me-Not and Hairy Maclary Six Stories
1997 – Hairy Maclary SIT
1998 – Slinky Malinki Catflaps
1999 – Hairy Maclary and Zachary Quack
2000 – Hedgehog Howdedo
2001 – Scarface Claw and The Apple Tree and Other Stories
2002 – Schnitzel von Krumm, Dogs Never Climb Trees
2004 – The Other Ark
2005 – Zachary Quack Minimonster
2006 – Slinky Malinki's Christmas Crackers
2007 – Hairy Maclary's Hat Tricks
2008 – The Dudgeon is Coming
2009 – Hairy Maclary, Shoo
2012 – Slinky Malinki Early Bird
2017 – Scarface Claw - Hold Tight!

References

1941 births
Living people
New Zealand children's writers
Elam Art School alumni
People from Rotorua
New Zealand women children's writers
21st-century New Zealand writers
20th-century New Zealand writers
Dames Companion of the New Zealand Order of Merit
20th-century New Zealand women writers
21st-century New Zealand women writers
Writers who illustrated their own writing